NBS 24/7 is a television program produced by Kestrel Communications on Speed Channel. Every Monday, the show profiled some of the crews and drivers of NASCAR's Busch Series. Each 30-minute episode gave a look, not just at those profiled during races, but behind-the-scenes as well. Two of the many drivers looked at on the show include Casey Atwood and David Stremme. The show premiered in February 2004, and was a replacement for the failed Inside NBS, which was cancelled after just one season.

Seasons 
Season 1: Featured teams were FitzBradshaw Racing, Braun Racing, and Akins Motorsports (as well as their drivers, including Tim Fedewa, Kasey Kahne, David Stremme, and Casey Atwood).

Season 2: The teams remained the same, however Fedewa, Atwood, and Kahne were not featured.  Stremme moved from FBR to Braun after previous driver Shane Hmiel's ban from the sport. Jason Leffler, A. J. Foyt IV, and Joel Kauffman were part of the show in the latter part of season 2.

Season 3: Attempting to capitalize on the rookie hype for the 2006 season, NBS 24/7 changed its name to NBS 24/7: The Rookies, again traveled with FitzBradshaw Racing and Akins Motorsports, but this time covered their rookies, Kauffman and Foyt. The show also looked at the other 2006 Busch ROTY contenders (including Danny O'Quinn Jr., Todd Kluever, and Burney Lamar).

On June 19, 2006, the show aired its final episode.

External links
 

Automotive television series
NASCAR on television
Speed (TV network) original programming
2004 American television series debuts
2006 American television series endings
NASCAR Xfinity Series